The 1907 Primera División was the 7th. season of top-flight football in Uruguay.

Overview
The tournament consisted of a round-robin championship. It involved six teams, and the champion was CURCC. This edition marked the debut of the River Plate which had risen from the second division last season (the first ascent of the story).

Teams

League standings 

The match Montevideo – Nacional was not contested.
Promoted for next season: Bristol, Dublin, French and Albion.

References
Uruguay – List of final tables on RSSSF

Uruguayan Primera División seasons
Uru
1